Clint Calvin Hearn (March 29, 1866 – February 11, 1928) was a United States Army officer in the late 19th and early 20th centuries. He served in World War I and received the Distinguished Service Medal.

Biography
Hearn was born on March 29, 1859, in Weston, Texas. He graduated from the United States Military Academy in 1890.

Hearn was commissioned into the Fourth Artillery. He graduated from the Artillery School in 1894, from the School of Submarine Defense in 1898, from the United States Army War College in 1912, and from the General Staff College in 1920. Circa 1904 he was co-developer of the Whistler-Hearn plotting board and authored a manual on fire control. Hearn was promoted to the rank of brigadier general on August 5, 1917, and he commanded the 153rd Field Artillery Brigade in the 78th Infantry Division. He received the Distinguished Service Medal for his efforts. Hearn reverted to his permanent rank of colonel on June 15, 1919. He commanded the Harbor Defenses of Manila and Subic Bays in the Philippines in 1919.

After the war's end, starting on April 10, 1922, Hearn served as the Chief of Staff of the Non-Divisional Group of the Reserve Units in Harrisburg, Pennsylvania. He retired in 1927.

Hearn died in Atlanta, Georgia on February 11, 1928, and he is buried at Arlington National Cemetery. Congress restored his brigadier general rank in June 1930.

Personal life
Hearn married Laura Wright Ovaker on December 2, 1897.

References

Bibliography
 
 
 

1866 births
1928 deaths
People from Collin County, Texas
Military personnel from Georgia (U.S. state)
Recipients of the Distinguished Service Medal (US Army)
United States Army generals of World War I
United States Army generals
United States Military Academy alumni
United States Army War College alumni
United States Army Command and General Staff College alumni
Burials at Arlington National Cemetery
Military personnel from Texas